The Waiorongomai River is a river of the Wellington Region of New Zealand's North Island. It flows generally east from its sources in the Remutaka Forest Park to reach the southern end of Lake Wairarapa.

See also
List of rivers of New Zealand

References

Rivers of the Wellington Region
Rivers of New Zealand